Manorom is a district (amphoe) in the northeastern part of Chai Nat province, central Thailand.

Geography
Neighboring districts are (from the south clockwise) Mueang Chainat and Wat Sing of Chainat Province; Mueang Uthai Thani of Uthai Thani province; Phayuha Khiri and Takhli of Nakhon Sawan province.

Administration

Central administration 
Manorom is divided into seven sub-districts (tambons), which are further subdivided into 40 administrative villages (mubans).

Local administration 
There are four sub-district municipalities (thesaban tambon) in the district:
 Khung Samphao consisting of parts of sub-district Khung Samphao.
 Hang Nam Sakhon consisting of sub-district Hang Nam Sakhon and parts of sub-district U Taphao.
 Manorom consisting of parts of sub-district Khung Samphao.
 Sila Dan consisting of sub-district Sila Dan.

There are four sub-district administrative organizations (SAO) in the district:
 Wat Khok consisting of sub-district Wat Khok.
 Tha Chanuan consisting of sub-district Tha Chanuan.
 Rai Phatthana consisting of sub-district Rai Phatthana.
 U Taphao consisting of parts of sub-district U Taphao.

References

External links
amphoe.com (Thai)

Manorom